The Roraiman flycatcher (Myiophobus roraimae) is a species of bird in the family Tyrannidae.  It is found in Bolivia, Brazil, Colombia, Ecuador, Guyana, Peru, and Venezuela. Its natural habitat is subtropical or tropical moist montane forests.

References

Roraiman flycatcher
Birds of Venezuela
Roraiman flycatcher
Roraiman flycatcher
Roraiman flycatcher
Taxonomy articles created by Polbot
Birds of the Tepuis